Diego Ayala (born April 29, 1979) is a former professional tennis player from the United States.

Biography

Early life
Born in Argentina, Ayala grew up in southern Florida and competed for the University of Miami in college tennis.

As a young player on the junior circuit he had a win over Roger Federer, at the 1997 Coffee Bowl competition.

Professional career
Ayala turned professional in 1998 and played most of his top level tennis in the doubles format, in which he reached as high as 100 in the world.

At the 2003 RCA Championships in Indianapolis he made the first and only final of his ATP Tour career. He and Robby Ginepri defeated the second and third seeded pairings en route to the final, where they faced Mario Ančić and Andy Ram. Ayala and Ginepri took the first set, then lost the second in a tiebreak, before losing a close final 5–7 in the third set. He also made it into the singles main draw, as a qualifier.

In 2004 he featured in the men's doubles at the Wimbledon Championships with Brian Vahaly, as lucky losers. The pair were beaten in the first round by David Škoch and Álex López Morón.

He won a total of three Challenger titles, all in doubles.

Coaching
Ayala has coached Robby Ginepri and Jelena Janković. He worked with Eugenie Bouchard at the 2005 Australian Open where she reached the quarter-finals. His association with Bouchard had begun when she was a junior and Ayala coached her at the Saviano Academy.

ATP Tour career finals

Doubles: 1 (0–1)

Challenger titles

Doubles: (3)

References

External links
 
 

1979 births
Living people
American male tennis players
American tennis coaches
Miami Hurricanes men's tennis players
Argentine emigrants to the United States
Sportspeople from Córdoba, Argentina
Tennis people from Florida